Captain Edward Archibald Hume (died 27 August 1915) held the office of Chief Magistrate of colonial Gambia (now called office of the Chief Justice of the Gambia) from 1909 until 1913. After his retirement from colonial service he was selected as the Conservative and Unionist Party candidate in the 1914 general election for the Banffshire constituency.  However the election was deferred due to World War I.

Personal life 
He completed his degree at Trinity College, Oxford, in 1900. He married Violet Mary Hope on 30 July 1912.

Death 
He died in active service from a bullet wound in the spine on 27 August 1915 as he fought in the First World War. He was buried at sea.

References 

Chief justices of the Gambia
1915 deaths
Year of birth missing
British military personnel killed in World War I
South Staffordshire Regiment officers
Burials at sea
British Army personnel of World War I